This article lists the colonial residents of Burundi, during the time when modern-day Burundi was part of German East Africa and Ruanda-Urundi.

Overview of office

German rule
The Germans established the office of Resident of Urundi in 1906. They moved the seat of the residency to Gitega in 1912.

Belgian rule
After Urundi fell under Belgian control and became part of the League of Nations mandate of Ruanda-Urundi, the Belgians placed it under the oversight of a Residency based in Gitega. The office included a resident, assistant resident, and other staff for specialised purposes. This system of administration continued when Ruanda-Urundi became a United Nations trust territory. A significant amount of Belgian colonial policy was carried out by the residency. The office of the Vice Governor-General, based in Usumbura (now Bujumbura), was responsible for overseeing the whole of Ruanda-Urundi.

List

(Dates in italics indicate de facto continuation of office)

See also
 List of colonial governors of Ruanda-Urundi
 List of colonial residents of Rwanda

References

Works cited

External links
 World Statesmen – Burundi

Burundi, Colonial residents of
Colonial residents
Colonial residents